The East Longs Peak Trail, Longs Peak Trail, Keyhole Route or Shelf Trail in Rocky Mountain National Park is listed on the National Register of Historic Places for its significance in the early recreational development of the park. The trail was laid out in 1878 by Reverend Elkanah Lamb, long before the designation of the region as parkland. It was extended in  1910 by Enos Mills. The trail leads from the Tahosa Valley, running counterclockwise around Longs Peak and reaching the summit at 14,259 feet.

See also
National Register of Historic Places listings in Boulder County, Colorado
National Register of Historic Places listings in Larimer County, Colorado

References

Hiking trails in Colorado
Park buildings and structures on the National Register of Historic Places in Colorado
Protected areas of Boulder County, Colorado
Protected areas of Larimer County, Colorado
National Register of Historic Places in Boulder County, Colorado
National Register of Historic Places in Larimer County, Colorado
National Register of Historic Places in Rocky Mountain National Park